Nguyễn Thị Sen (born 16 February 1991) is a Vietnamese badminton player from Lạng Giang, Bắc Giang. Partnered with Vũ Thị Trang, she won the women's doubles title at the 2014 and 2016 Vietnam International Series and also the 2016 Bangladesh International tournaments.

Achievements

BWF International Challenge/Series (3 titles) 
Women's doubles

  BWF International Challenge tournament
  BWF International Series tournament
  BWF Future Series tournament

References

External links 
 

1991 births
Living people
People from Bắc Giang Province
Vietnamese female badminton players
Competitors at the 2007 Southeast Asian Games
Competitors at the 2011 Southeast Asian Games
Competitors at the 2013 Southeast Asian Games
Competitors at the 2015 Southeast Asian Games
Competitors at the 2017 Southeast Asian Games
21st-century Vietnamese women
Southeast Asian Games competitors for Vietnam